Marines Football Club is an association football club from Gisenyi, Rwanda. The team currently competes in the Rwanda National Football League, and plays its home games at the Umuganda Stadium.

References

External links
Soccerway

Football clubs in Rwanda